The 1951 Kansas State Wildcats football team represented Kansas State University in the 1951 college football season.  The team's head football coach was Bill Meek, in his first season at the helm of the Wildcats.  The Wildcats played their home games in Memorial Stadium.  1951 saw the team finish with a record of 0–9, and a 0–6 record in Big Seven Conference play.  The Wildcats scored just 73 points while giving up 212.  They finished in seventh place in the Big Seven Conference.

Kansas State's record was 1–7–1 at the end of the season, including a 6–6 tie with Nebraska and a 14–12 victory over Missouri.  However, when head coach Bill Meek learned after the season that an ineligible player had participated, he immediately self-reported the violation to the NCAA and the school voluntarily forfeited the win and the tie.

Schedule

References

Kansas State
Kansas State Wildcats football seasons
College football winless seasons
Kansas State Wildcats football